Hamse Mahdi Hussein (born 7 January 2000) is a Danish footballer of Somalian descent, who plays as a midfielder.

Youth career
Hussein started his career at Vejgaard BK before joining AaB as a U13 player. In May 2016, 16-year Hussein signed a three-year deal with AaB. In the 2017/18 season, he was instrumental in securing silver medals in the U19 League for AaB, before leaving the club during the season to join Hobro IK. Here Hussein became a regular part of the U19 team, while it also turned into a lot of matches in the Reserve League as well as training with the first team squad.

Career

Hobro IK
In September 2018, Hussein was called up for his first ever first team game in the Danish Cup against Ledøje-Smørum Fodbold. However, he remained on the benh. He was also on the bench for three games later in the 2018-19 season but didn't get his official debut until 23 August 2019 against Odense Boldklub. Hussein started on the bench but replaced Julian Kristoffersen in the 91st minute.

On 12 August 2020 the club confirmed, that Hussein had left the club.

See also
 Mathies Skjellerup

References

Living people
2000 births
Association football midfielders
Danish men's footballers
Danish people of Somali descent
Danish Superliga players
Hobro IK players